Kulosaari metro station is a ground-level station on the Helsinki Metro. It serves the island district of Kulosaari in East Helsinki. There are 50 bicycle and 36 car parking spaces at the station. Both lines M1 and M2 serve Kulosaari.

The station was opened on 1 June 1982, and is therefore one of the original stations on the system. Kulosaari underwent a facelift in 2011. The station was originally designed by Jaakko Ylinen and Jarmo Maunula. It is located 1.8 kilometres from Kalasatama metro station and 1.4 kilometres from Herttoniemi metro station.

References

External links

Helsinki Metro stations
Railway stations opened in 1982
1982 establishments in Finland
Kulosaari